Gabrielle Émilie Le Tonnelier de Breteuil, Marquise du Châtelet (17 December 1706 – 10 September 1749) was a French natural philosopher and mathematician from the early 1730s until her death due to complications during childbirth in 1749. Her most recognized achievement is her translation of and commentary on Isaac Newton's 1687 book Philosophiæ Naturalis Principia Mathematica containing basic laws of physics. The translation, published posthumously in 1756, is still considered the standard French translation. Her commentary includes a contribution to Newtonian mechanics—the postulate of an additional conservation law for total energy, of which kinetic energy of motion is one element. This led to her conceptualization of energy as such, and to derive its quantitative relationships to the mass and velocity of an object.

Her philosophical magnum opus, Institutions de Physique (Paris, 1740, first edition; Foundations of Physics), circulated widely, generated heated debates, and was republished and translated into several other languages within two years of its original publication. She participated in the famous vis viva debate, concerning the best way to measure the force of a body and the best means of thinking about conservation principles. Posthumously, her ideas were heavily represented in the most famous text of the French Enlightenment, the Encyclopédie of Denis Diderot and Jean le Rond d'Alembert, first published shortly after du Châtelet's death. Numerous biographies, books and plays have been written about her life and work in the two centuries since her death. In the early 21st century, her life and ideas have generated renewed interest.

Émilie du Châtelet had, over many years, a relationship with the writer and philosopher Voltaire.

Contribution to philosophy 
In addition to producing famous translations of works by authors such as Bernard Mandeville and Isaac Newton, Du Châtelet wrote a number of significant philosophical essays, letters and books that were well known in her time.

Because of her well-known collaboration and romantic involvement with Voltaire, which spanned much of her adult life, for generations Du Châtelet has been known as mistress and collaborator to her much better known intellectual companion. Her accomplishments and achievements have often been subsumed under his and, as a result, even today she is often mentioned only within the context of Voltaire's life and work during the period of the early French Enlightenment. The ideals of her works spread from the ideals of individual empowerment to issues of the social contract.

Recently, however, professional philosophers and historians have transformed the reception of Du Châtelet. Historical evidence indicates that Du Châtelet's work had a very significant influence on the philosophical and scientific conversations of the 1730s and 1740s – in fact, she was famous and respected by the greatest thinkers of her time. Francesco Algarotti styled the dialogue of Il Newtonianismo per le dame based on conversations he observed between Du Châtelet and Voltaire in Cirey.

Du Châtelet corresponded with renowned mathematicians such as Johann II Bernoulli and Leonhard Euler, early developers of calculus. She was also tutored by Bernoulli's prodigy students, Pierre Louis Moreau de Maupertuis and Alexis Claude Clairaut. Frederick the Great of Prussia, who re-founded the Academy of Sciences in Berlin, was her great admirer, and corresponded with both Voltaire and Du Châtelet regularly. He introduced Du Châtelet to Leibniz's philosophy by sending her the works of Christian Wolff, and Du Châtelet sent him a copy of her Institutions.

Her works were published and republished in Paris, London, and Amsterdam; they were translated into German and Italian; and, they were discussed in the most important scholarly journals of the era, including the Memoires des Trévoux, the Journal des Sçavans, the Göttingische Zeitungen von gelehrten Sachen, and others. Perhaps most intriguingly, many of her ideas were represented in various sections of the Encyclopédie of Diderot and D'Alembert, and some of the articles in the Encyclopédie are a direct copy of her work (this is an active area of current academic research - the latest research can be found at Project Vox, a Duke University research initiative).

Biography

Early life
Émilie du Châtelet was born on 17 December 1706 in Paris, the only girl amongst six children. Three brothers lived to adulthood: René-Alexandre (b. 1698), Charles-Auguste (b. 1701), and Elisabeth-Théodore (b. 1710). Her eldest brother, René-Alexandre, died in 1720, and the next brother, Charles-Auguste, died in 1731. However, her younger brother, Elisabeth-Théodore, lived to a successful old age, becoming an abbot and eventually a bishop. Two other brothers died very young. Du Châtelet also had a half-sister, Michelle, who was born of her father and Anne Bellinzani, an intelligent woman who was interested in astronomy and married to an important Parisian official.

Her father was Louis Nicolas le Tonnelier de Breteuil, a member of the lesser nobility. At the time of Du Châtelet's birth, her father held the position of the Principal Secretary and Introducer of Ambassadors to King Louis XIV. He held a weekly salon on Thursdays, to which well-respected writers and scientists were invited. Her mother was Gabrielle Anne de Froullay, Baronne de Breteuil.

Early education
Du Châtelet's education has been the subject of much speculation, but nothing is known with certainty.

Among their acquaintances was Fontenelle, the perpetual secretary of the French Académie des Sciences. Du Châtelet's father Louis-Nicolas, recognizing her early brilliance, arranged for Fontenelle to visit and talk about astronomy with her when she was 10 years old. Du Châtelet's mother, Gabrielle-Anne de Froulay, was brought up in a convent, at the time the predominant educational institution available to French girls and women. While some sources believe her mother did not approve of her intelligent daughter, or of her husband's encouragement of Émilie's intellectual curiosity, there are also other indications that her mother not only approved of Du Châtelet's early education, but actually encouraged her to vigorously question stated fact.

In either case, such encouragement would have been seen as unusual for parents of their time and status.  When she was small, her father arranged training for her in physical activities such as fencing and riding, and as she grew older, he brought tutors to the house for her. As a result, by the age of twelve she was fluent in Latin, Italian, Greek and German; she was later to publish translations into French of Greek and Latin plays and philosophy. She received education in mathematics, literature, and science.

Du Châtelet also liked to dance, was a passable performer on the harpsichord, sang opera, and was an amateur actress. As a teenager, short of money for books, she used her mathematical skills to devise highly successful strategies for gambling.

Marriage
On 12 June 1725, she married the Marquis Florent-Claude du Chastellet-Lomont. Her marriage conferred the title of Marquise du Chastellet. Like many marriages among the nobility, theirs was arranged.  As a wedding gift, her husband was made governor of Semur-en-Auxois in Burgundy by his father; the recently married couple moved there at the end of September 1725.  Du Châtelet was eighteen at the time, her husband thirty-four.

Children
The Marquis Florent-Claude du Chastellet and Émilie du Châtelet had three children: Françoise-Gabrielle-Pauline (30 June 1726 – 1754, married in 1743 to Alfonso Carafa, Duca di Montenero), Louis Marie Florent (born 20 November 1727), and Victor-Esprit (born 11 April 1733).  Victor-Esprit died as an infant in late summer 1734, likely the last Sunday in August. On 4 September 1749 Émilie du Châtelet gave birth to Stanislas-Adélaïde du Châtelet (daughter of Jean François de Saint-Lambert). She died as a toddler in Lunéville on 6 May 1751.

Resumption of studies
After bearing three children, Émilie, Marquise du Châtelet, considered her marital responsibilities fulfilled and reached an agreement with her husband to live separate lives while still maintaining one household. In 1733, aged 26, Du Châtelet resumed her mathematical studies. Initially, she was tutored in algebra and calculus by Moreau de Maupertuis, a member of the Academy of Sciences; although mathematics was not his forte, he had received a solid education from Johann Bernoulli, who also taught Leonhard Euler. However by 1735 Du Châtelet had turned for her mathematical training to Alexis Clairaut, a mathematical prodigy known best for Clairaut's equation and Clairaut's theorem. Du Châtelet resourcefully sought some of France's best tutors and scholars to mentor her in mathematics. On one occasion at the Café Gradot, a place where men frequently gathered for intellectual discussion, she was politely ejected when she attempted to join one of her teachers. Undeterred, she returned and entered after having men's clothing made for herself.

Relationship with Voltaire

Du Châtelet may have met Voltaire in her childhood at one of her father's salons; Voltaire himself dates their meeting to 1729, when he returned from his exile in London. However, their friendship developed from May 1733 when she re-entered society after the birth of her third child.

Du Châtelet invited Voltaire to live at her country house at Cirey in Haute-Marne, northeastern France, and he became her long-time companion. There she studied physics and mathematics and published scientific articles and translations. To judge from Voltaire's letters to friends and their commentaries on each other's work, they lived together with great mutual liking and respect. As a literary rather than scientific person, Voltaire implicitly acknowledged her contributions to his 1738 Elements of the Philosophy of Newton. This was through a poem dedicated to her at the beginning of the text and in the preface, where Voltaire praised her study and contributions. The book's chapters on optics show strong similarities with her own Essai sur l'optique. She was able to contribute further to the campaign by a laudatory review in the Journal des savants.

Sharing a passion for science, Voltaire and Du Châtelet collaborated scientifically. They set up a laboratory in Du Châtelet's home in Lorraine. In a healthy competition, they both entered the 1738 Paris Academy prize contest on the nature of fire, since Du Châtelet disagreed with Voltaire's essay. Although neither of them won, both essays received honourable mention and were published. She thus became the first woman to have a scientific paper published by the Academy.

Social life after living with Voltaire

Du Châtelet's relationship with Voltaire caused her to give up most of her social life to become more involved with her study in mathematics with the teacher of Pierre-Louis Moreau de Maupertuis. He introduced the ideas of Isaac Newton to her. Letters written by Du Châtelet explain how she felt during the transition from Parisian socialite to rural scholar, from "one life to the next."

Final pregnancy and death

In May 1748, Du Châtelet began an affair with the poet Jean François de Saint-Lambert and became pregnant. In a letter to a friend she confided her fears that she would not survive her pregnancy. On the night of 4 September 1749 she gave birth to a daughter, Stanislas-Adélaïde. Du Châtelet died on 10 September 1749  at Château de Lunéville, from a pulmonary embolism. She was 42. Her daughter died 20 months later.

Scientific research and publications

Criticizing Locke and the debate on thinking matter
In her writing, Du Châtelet criticizes John Locke's philosophy. She emphasizes the necessity of the verification of knowledge through experience: "Locke's idea of the possibility of thinking matter is […] abstruse." Her critique on Locke originates in her commentary on Bernard de Mandeville's The Fable of the Bees. She confronts us with her resolute statement in favor of universal principles which precondition human knowledge and action, and maintains that this kind of law is innate. Du Châtelet claims the necessity of a universal presupposition, because if there is no such beginning, all our knowledge is relative. In that way, Du Châtelet rejects Locke's aversion to innate ideas and prior principles. She also reverses Locke's negation of the principle of contradiction, which would constitute the basis of her methodic reflections in the Institutions. On the contrary, she affirms her arguments in favor of the necessity of prior and universal principles. "Two and two could then make as well 4 as 6 if 
prior principles did not exist."

Pierre Louis Moreau de Maupertuis' and Julien Offray de La Mettrie's references to Du Châtelet's deliberations on motion, free will, thinking matter, numbers and the way to do metaphysics are a sign of the importance of her reflections. She rebuts the claim to finding truth by using mathematical laws, and argues against Maupertuis.

Warmth and brightness

In 1737 du Châtelet published a paper Dissertation sur la nature et la propagation du feu, based upon her research into the science of fire. In it she speculated that there may be colours in other suns that are not found in the spectrum of sunlight on Earth.

Institutions de Physique
Her book Institutions de Physique ("Lessons in Physics") was published in 1740; it was presented as a review of new ideas in science and philosophy to be studied by her 13 year old son, but it incorporated and sought to reconcile complex ideas from the leading thinkers of the time. The book and subsequent debate contributed to her becoming a member of the Academy of Sciences of the Institute of Bologna in 1746. Du Châtelet originally preferred anonymity in her role as the author, because she wished to conceal her sex. Ultimately, however, the Institutions were convincing to salon-dwelling intellectuals in spite of the commonplace sexism. 

The Institutions discussed, refuted, and synthesized many ideas of prominent mathematicians and physicists of the time, including Newton, Descartes, and Leibniz. In chapter I, Du Châtelet included a description of her rules of reasoning, based largely on Descartes’s principle of contradiction and Leibniz’s principle of sufficient reason. In chapter II, she applied these rules of reasoning to metaphysics, discussing god, space, time, and matter. In chapters III through VI, Du Châtelet continues to discuss the role of god and his relationship to his creation. In chapter VII, she breaks down the concept of matter into three parts: the macroscopic substance available to sensory perception, the atoms composing that macroscopic material, and an even smaller constituent unit similarly imperceptible to human senses. However, she carefully added that there was no way to know how many levels truly existed. The remainder of the Institutions considered more metaphysics and classical mechanics. Interestingly, Du Châtelet discussed the concepts of space and time in a manner more consistent with modern relativity than her contemporaries. She described both space and time in the abstract as representations of the relationships between coexistent bodies rather than physical substances. This included an acknowledgement that “absolute” place is an idealization and that “relative” place was the only real, measurable quantity. Du Châtelet also presented a thorough explanation of Newton’s laws of motion and their function on earth.

Forces Vives

In 1741 du Châtelet published a book titled Réponse de Madame la Marquise du Chastelet, a la lettre que M. de Mairan. Dortous de Mairan, secretary of the Academy of Sciences, had published a set of arguments addressed to her regarding the appropriate mathematical expression for forces vives. Du Châtelet presented a spirited point by point rebuttal of de Mairan's arguments, causing him to withdraw from the controversy.

Immanuel Kant's first publication in 1747 'Thoughts on the True Estimation of Living Forces' (Gedanken zur wahren Schätzung der lebendigen Kräfte) focuses on Du Châtelet's pamphlet against the secretary of the French Academy of Sciences, Mairan. Kant's opponent, Johann Augustus Eberhard accused Kant of taking ideas from Du Châtelet.

Advocacy of kinetic energy
Although in the early 18th century the concepts of force and momentum had been long understood, the idea of energy as transferable between different systems was still in its infancy and would not be fully resolved until the 19th century. It is now accepted that the total mechanical momentum of a system is conserved and none is lost to friction. Simply put, there is no 'momentum friction' and momentum can not transfer between different forms, and particularly there is no potential momentum. Emmy Noether later proved this to be true for all problems where the initial state is symmetric in generalized coordinates. Mechanical energy, kinetic and potential, may be lost to another form, but the total is conserved in time. 

The Du Châtelet contribution was the hypothesis of the conservation of total energy, as distinct from momentum. In doing so, she became the first to elucidate the concept of energy as such, and to quantify its relationship to mass and velocity based on her own empirical studies. Inspired by the theories of Gottfried Leibniz, she repeated and publicized an experiment originally devised by Willem 's Gravesande in which balls were dropped from different heights into a sheet of soft clay. Each ball's kinetic energy - as indicated by the quantity of material displaced - was shown to be proportional to the square of the velocity. The deformation of the clay was found to be directly proportional to the height the balls were dropped from, equal to the initial potential energy. 

With the exception of Leibniz, earlier workers like Newton believed that "energy" was indistinct from momentum and therefore proportional to velocity. According to this understanding, the deformation of the clay should have been proportional to the square root of the height from which the balls were dropped. Energy must always have the same dimensions in any form, which is necessary to be able to relate it in different forms (kinetic, potential, heat . . .). 

Newton's work assumed the exact conservation of only mechanical momentum. A broad range of mechanical problems are soluble only if energy conservation is included. The collision and scattering of two point masses is one of them. Leonhard Euler and Joseph-Louis Lagrange established a more formal framework for mechanics using the results of du Châtelet.

Translation and commentary on Newton's Principia
In 1749, the year of Du Châtelet's death, she completed the work regarded as her outstanding achievement: her translation into French, with her commentary, of Newton's Philosophiae Naturalis Principia Mathematica (often referred to as simply the Principia), including her derivation of the notion of conservation of energy from its principles of mechanics. Published ten years after her death, today Du Châtelet's translation of the Principia is still the standard translation of the work into French. Her translation and commentary of the Principia contributed to the completion of the scientific revolution in France and to its acceptance in Europe.

Other contributions

Development of financial derivatives
She lost the considerable sum for the time of 84,000 francs—some of it borrowed—in one evening at the table at the Court of Fontainebleau, to card cheats. To raise the money to pay back her debts she devised an ingenious financing arrangement similar to modern derivatives, whereby she paid tax collectors a fairly low sum for the right to their future earnings (they were allowed to keep a portion of the taxes they collected for the King), and promised to pay the court gamblers part of these future earnings.

Biblical scholarship
Du Châtelet wrote a critical analysis of the entire Bible. A synthesis of her remarks on the book of Genesis was published in English in 1967 by Ira O. Wade of Princeton in his book Voltaire and Madame du Châtelet: An Essay on Intellectual Activity at Cirey and a book of her complete notes was published in 2011, in the original French, edited and annotated by Bertram Eugene Schwarzbach.

Discourse on happiness
Du Châtelet wrote a monograph, Discours sur le bonheur, on the nature of happiness both in general and specialised to women.

Translation of the Fable of the Bees, and other works
Du Châtelet translated The Fable of the Bees in a free adaptation. She also wrote works on optics, rational linguistics, and the nature of free will.

Support of women's education
In her first independent work, the preface to her translation of the Fable of the Bees, du Châtelet argues strongly for women's education, particularly a strong secondary education as was available for young men in the French collèges. By denying women a good education, she argues, society prevents women from becoming eminent in the arts and sciences.

Legacy

Du Châtelet made a crucial scientific contribution in making Newton's historic work more accessible in a timely, accurate and insightful French translation, augmented by her own original concept of energy conservation.

A main-belt minor planet and a crater on Venus have been named in her honor, and she is the subject of three plays: Legacy of Light by Karen Zacarías; Émilie: La Marquise Du Châtelet Defends Her Life Tonight by Lauren Gunderson and Urania: the Life of Émilie du Châtelet by Jyl Bonaguro. The opera Émilie by Kaija Saariaho is about the last moments of her life.

Du Châtelet is often represented in portraits with mathematical iconography, such as holding a pair of dividers or a page of geometrical calculations. In the early nineteenth century, a French pamphlet of celebrated women (Femmes célèbres) introduced a possibly apocryphal story of Du Châtelet's childhood.  According to this story, a servant fashioned a doll for her by dressing up wooden dividers as a doll; however, du Châtelet undressed the dividers and intuiting their purpose, made a circle with them.

The Institut Émilie du Châtelet, which was founded in France in 2006, supports "the development and diffusion of research on women, sex, and gender".

Since 2016, the French Society of Physics (la Société Française de Physique) has awarded the Émilie Du Châtelet Prize to a physicist or team of researchers for excellence in Physics.

Duke University also presents an annual Du Châtelet Prize in Philosophy of Physics "for previously unpublished work in philosophy of physics by a graduate student or junior scholar".

On December 17, 2021, Google Doodle honored Du Châtelet.

Émilie du Châtelet is portrayed by the actress Hélène de Fougerolles in the docudrama Einstein's Big Idea.

Works

 Scientific
 Dissertation sur la nature et la propagation du feu (1st edition, 1739; 2nd edition, 1744)
 Institutions de physique (1st edition, 1740; 2nd edition, 1742)
 Principes mathématiques de la philosophie naturelle par feue Madame la Marquise du Châtelet (1st edition, 1756; 2nd edition, 1759)

 Other
 Examen de la Genèse
 Examen des Livres du Nouveau Testament
 Discours sur le bonheur

See also

 Timeline of women in science

Explanatory notes

References

General sources 
 
 
 

 {{cite book| editor-last = Hagengruber| editor-first= Ruth | year = 2011  | title = Émilie du Châtelet between Leibniz and Newton | publisher = Springer | isbn= 978-94-007-2074-9}}
 
 

 

External links

 Émilie Du Châtelet (1706-1749), Project Vox Zinsser, Judith. 2007. Mentors, the marquise Du Châtelet and historical memory.
 
 "Émilie du Châtelet", Biographies of Women Mathematicians, Agnes Scott College
 The Portraits of Émilie du Châtelet at MathPages
 Voltaire and Émilie from the website of the Château de Cirey, accessed 11 December 2006.
 Correspondence between Frederick the Great and the Marquise du Châtelet Digital edition of Trier University Library (French and German text)
 St Petersburg Manuscripts, first digital and critical edition by the Center for the History of Women Philosophers and Scientists in cooperation with the National Library of Russia
 Project Continua: Biography of Émilie Du Châtelet
 Lamothe, Lori. "Dangerous Liaisons: Emilie du Chatelet and Voltaire's Passionate Love Affair" at History of Yesterday
 
 Émilie Du Châtelet: bibliographical and biographical references. - Center for the History of Women Philosophers and Scientists

News media

 "The scientist that history forgot," The Guardian 15 May 2006.

 Object Lesson / Objet de Lux Article on Émilie du Châtelet from Cabinet (magazine)
 PhysicsWeb'' article: Émilie du Châtelet: the genius without a beard
 National Public Radio Morning Edition, 27 November 2006: Passionate Minds
 Women Scientists Today Link to CBC radio interview with author David Bodanis.
 Link to ARTE-Doku-Drama E = mc² – Einsteins große Idee. ARTE TV 26 April 2008, 12 March 2011.

1706 births
1749 deaths
18th-century French mathematicians
18th-century French philosophers
18th-century philosophers
18th-century French women scientists
18th-century French women writers
18th-century French writers
Scientists from Paris
French marchionesses
Contributors to the Encyclopédie (1751–1772)
French physicists
French women scientists
Women encyclopedists
French women mathematicians
French women physicists
Deaths in childbirth
Deaths from pulmonary embolism
18th-century French translators
French women philosophers
Latin–French translators
18th-century French scientists
Muses